Opisthopatus roseus is a species of velvet worm in the Peripatopsidae family. As traditionally defined, this species is rose pink with 18 pairs of legs. Known as the pink velvet worm, it is found only in the Weza Forest, a Mistbelt Forest in South Africa. Specimens have been found on the forest floor amongst leaf litter, beneath, and within fallen logs.

Phylogenetic analysis, however, casts doubt on the traditional species delimitation based on morphology and militates in favor of a broader species definition based on a genetic clade instead. Phylogenetic results indicate that O. herbertorum, described as uniformly white with 17 leg pairs, is a junior synonym of O. roseus. This genetic clade also includes some velvet worms with 16 leg pairs that would traditionally be considered specimens of O. cinctipes. This broader understanding of O. roseus features intraspecific variation in leg number, ranging from 16 to 18 pairs, includes a range of colors from blood red or indigo to pearl white, and entails a broader geographic distribution in the southern part of the Drakensberg Mountains in Kwa-Zulu Natal province of South Africa.

Conservation 

The pink velvet worm was previously considered extinct but is now listed as Critically Endangered by the IUCN Red List. Habitat loss and degradation are thought to be the cause of the species' decline.

References

Further reading 
 
 

Endemic fauna of South Africa
Fauna of South Africa
IUCN-assessed onychophorans
Onychophorans of temperate Africa
Onychophoran species
Taxonomy articles created by Polbot